The Durham Flower Festival is an annual flower and horticulture show run by, and held at, East Durham College's Houghall Campus in Durham, County Durham, England. The festival is held in August and the inaugural show was held in 2014. The show was established by the College following the decision by Gateshead Council to axe the Gateshead Flower Show.

References

External links
 Archived copy of official website

Flower show
Flower shows
Garden festivals in England
Festivals in County Durham
Flower festivals in the United Kingdom
2014 establishments in England